The 2019 Brussels Cycling Classic was the 99th edition of the Brussels Cycling Classic road cycling one day race. It was held on 7 September 2019 as part of the 2019 UCI Europe Tour.

Teams
Twenty-five teams participated in the race, of which nine were UCI WorldTour teams, fifteen were UCI Professional Continental teams, and one was a UCI Continental Team. Of the 174 riders who started the race, only 155 riders finished.

UCI WorldTeams

 
 
 
 
 
 
 
 
 

UCI Professional Continental Teams

 
 
 
 
 
 
 
 
 
 
 
 
 
 
 

UCI Continental Teams

Results

References

External links

2019 Brussels Cycling Classic
Brussels Cycling Classic
Brussels Cycling Classic
Brussels Cycling Classic